The fortress of Cetin is situated  south of Cetingrad above the village of Podcetin, in Croatia. The date when Cetin was founded is unknown. There are some indications that a settlement existed there in the times of the Roman Empire. The Parish of All Saints, in which the fortress is situated, was first mentioned in 1334. In 1387, king Sigismund, Holy Roman Emperor, gifted Cetin to Ivan Krčki. Thereby it became the property of the Frankopan family.

The Middle Ages were the golden era of Cetin. There was a Franciscan monastery and several churches near the fortress. In the 15th century, the Cetinski branch of Frankopan family was formed. It only lasted a hundred years. Ivan Frankopan Cetinski died in the Battle of Krbava field. His brother Grgur and son Franjo Frankopan became archbishops of Kalocsa. Franjo Frankopan was the last member of the Frankopan Cetinski family. After him, the fortress became property of the Frankopan Slunjski family.

Cetin played an important role in the history of Croatia. After the defeat at the Battle of Mohács in 1526, Croatian nobility gathered at the Parliament on Cetin. On 1 January 1527, they elected Ferdinand I, Archduke of Austria as the king of Croatia. The chart signed by Croatian nobles and representatives of Ferdinand of Habsburg is among the most important documents of Croatian statehood and is preserved in the Austrian State Archives in Vienna.

In the following centuries, Cetin was part of the Croatian Military Frontier, the borderland between the Habsburg monarchy and the Ottoman Empire. During this period, the Ottoman Army took control of it several times. The fortress was often damaged and repaired. Two stone plates with Ottoman Turkish inscriptions in the Croatian History Museum testify about reconstructions made during this period.

In 1790, Habsburg Army troops under the command of general Walisch finally won back Cetin Castle for the Habsburg Monarchy. The siege took one month, and after the battle several officers were decorated, including Johann I Josef, Prince of Liechtenstein. Cetin's status was finally confirmed during the peace conference in Svishtov. In 1809, Ottoman forces once again occupied Cetin but they withdrew the following year under the threats of Marshal Marmont, governor-general of Illyrian provinces. He forced Ottomans to withdraw from Cetin after briefly occupying Bihać. He was promised to not enter again to French Croatia. Once the Ottoman threat petered out the fortress was abandoned and turned into a quarry. Administrative control of the surrounding area was transferred to the village of Cetingrad, which developed north of Cetin.

References

 Radoslav Lopašić: Oko Kupe i Korane, Matica hrvatska, 1895, Zagreb
 Milan Kruhek: Cetin, grad izbornog sabora Kraljevine Hrvatske 1527, Karlovac County, 1997, Karlovac
 Iz memoara maršala Marmonta: ilirske uspomene 1806–1811, Čakavski Sabor, 1977, Split

External links
An old photo and a description of Cetin castle from 1866

Castles in Croatia
Buildings and structures in Karlovac County
Frankopan family
Tourist attractions in Karlovac County
Kordun